Mildred Ames (November 2, 1919 – July 20, 1994) was a US writer of children's literature, for older children, and some science fiction. Her science fiction works often concern issues of paranoia or questions of identity. One of her most famous teen novels in this genre, Anna to the Infinite Power (1981), was turned into a motion picture with the same name in 1982.

Selected works 
 Grandpa Jake and the Grand Christmas — 1990
 Who Will Speak for the Lamb? — 1989
 Conjuring Summer In — 1986
 Cassandra-Jamie — 1985
 The Silver Link, the Silken Tie — 1984
 Philo Potts, or, The Helping Hand Strikes Again — 1982
 Anna to the Infinite Power — 1981
 The Dancing Madness — 1980
 Nicky and the Joyous Noise — 1980
 The Wonderful Box — 1978
 What are Friends For? — 1978
 Without Hats, Who Can Tell the Good Guys? — 1976
 Is There Life on a Plastic Planet? — 1975

References

External links

 
The Encyclopedia of Science Fiction page 28.
Mildred Ames Papers, Special Collections at the University of Southern Mississippi (de Grummond Children's Literature Collection)

American children's writers
1919 births
1994 deaths
20th-century American novelists
American women novelists
20th-century American women writers
American science fiction writers
Women science fiction and fantasy writers